Hiroshi Umemura may refer to:
 Hiroshi Umemura (fighter)
 Hiroshi Umemura (mathematician)